Rosamunde (minor planet designation: 540 Rosamunde) is an S-type asteroid belonging to the Flora family in the Main Belt. Its diameter is about 19 km and it has an albedo of 0.243 . Its rotation period is 9.336 hours.

Rosamunde is named for a character in a play of the same title for which Franz Schubert wrote incidental music.

References

External links 
 
 

000540
Discoveries by Max Wolf
Named minor planets
540 Rosamunde
000540
19040803